Lysosome-associated membrane glycoprotein 3 (LAMP3, Lamp3) is a protein that in humans is encoded by the LAMP3 gene. It is one of the lysosome-associated membrane glycoproteins.

LAMP3 also known as DC-LAMP (Dendritic cell lysosomal associated membrane glycoprotein) is a member of the LAMP family along with LAMP1 and LAMP2, these proteins make up the members of the glycoconjugate coat present on the inside of the lysosomal membrane. In humans, this protein is almost exclusively found in mature Dendritic cells. While LAMP3 can be observed on the surface of dendritic cells, the protein is mainly found within lysosomes. LAMP3 first appears in the MHC Class II compartment and in cells aids in the identifying and processing of an antigen during an immune response. LAMP3 protein is linked with the maturation of dendritic cells, and as a marker for transformed type II pneumocytes or alveolar cells.

Studies have linked LAMP3 with the inhibition of the viral replication of Influenza A cells.

Structure and Tissue Distribution
LAMP3 is a Type I integral membrane protein consisting of about 416 amino acid residues with about 90% of the protein located within the lumen of the lysosomes. LAMP3 has been shown to be highly expressed in dendritic cells during cell differentiation and maturation. During human fetal development, between weeks 10 and 20, LAMP3 is highly expressed in the lungs, while in normal adult tissue cells LAMP3 is expressed in the lungs, appendix, testis and lymph nodes.

References

Further reading

External links 
 

Clusters of differentiation